Lauda Air S.p.A. was an Italian leisure charter airline headquartered in Milan and based at Milan Malpensa Airport.

History
The airline was a sister company of the Austrian Lauda Air and operated long haul charter services to the Caribbean, South America, Africa, Maldives and Thailand, mainly out of Milan Malpensa Airport. Lauda Air Italy was merged into the then newly established Livingston Energy Flight in 2003.

Fleet

During its existence, Lauda Air Italy operated the following aircraft:

References

External links

Italian companies disestablished in 2003
Defunct airlines of Italy
Airlines established in 1990
Airlines disestablished in 2003
Italian companies established in 1990
Lauda Air